Volo was a 500-ton barque stranded in the Bushman River in South Africa.

Volo had been built at Arendal, Norway in the 1880s and was homeported there. She undertook her final voyage under Captain Olsen, sailing from Goteburg, Sweden, carrying a cargo of Baltic pine timber to Lourenço Marques, Portuguese East Africa. Volo was sailing by dead reckoning, and on 5 March 1896 Captain Olsen judged the ship to be 200 miles from the coast. The following day Volo struck rocks off the coast and was holed, but was carried over the reef and successfully beached between Kwaaihoek and the mouth of the Bushman River.

The crew climbed into the rigging, and after some hours all 12 were able to reach the shore using lines secured with the help of local people who came to offer assistance. Some of the remains of Volo and her cargo were used to build houses in the area, and other artefacts were salvaged and are still displayed nearby.

References
report on the wreck of Volo

Barques
Ships built in Arendal
Tall ships of Norway
1880s ships
Maritime incidents in 1896
Shipwrecks of the South African Indian Ocean coast
Merchant ships of Norway
1896 in South Africa